Killivose, Zelah  is a hamlet south of Zelah in the parish of St Allen (where the population in the 2011 census was included.) in Cornwall, England.

References

Villages in Cornwall